The following table indicates the party of elected officials in the U.S. state of Rhode Island:
Governor
Lieutenant Governor
Secretary of State
Attorney General
State Treasurer

The table also indicates the historical party composition in the:
State Senate
State House of Representatives
State delegation to the U.S. Senate
State delegation to the U.S. House of Representatives

For years in which a presidential election was held, the table indicates which party's candidate received the state's electoral votes.

For a particular year, the noted partisan composition is that which either took office during that year or which maintained the office throughout the entire year. Only changes made outside of regularly scheduled elections are noted as affecting the partisan composition during a particular year. Shading is determined by the final result of any mid-cycle changes in partisan affiliation.

References

See also
Law and government in Rhode Island

Politics of Rhode Island
Government of Rhode Island
Rhode Island